Reitbach is a small river of Bavaria, Germany. It flows through the Englischer Garten in Munich. It is a short branch of the Oberstjägermeisterbach. The Oberstjägermeisterbach flows west and north of the Vogelinsel (lit. island of birds), the Reitbach south and east.

See also
List of rivers of Bavaria

Rivers of Bavaria
Rivers of Germany

de:Englischer Garten (München)#Bäche